The Zacke Cox Covered Bridge is east of Mecca, Indiana.  The single span Burr Arch Truss covered bridge structure was built by Joseph A. Britton in 1908.

It was added to the National Register of Historic Places in 1978.

History
Zachariah M. Cox was born in almost due north of this bridge in Coloma in 1857. His father was E.T. Cox and his family was quite prominent in Parke County with various family members owning nearly 1000 acres of land near the bridge.

Northwest of the mine is an old clay strip mine and coal and slate outcroppings can be viewed south of the bridge.

This bridge, along with the Harry Evans Covered Bridge and the Weisner Covered Bridge, all built by J.A. Britton, lack the traditional Britton Portals. Instead, they have a more semi-arched portal that more resembles the Hendricks Portals of the Wilkins Mill Covered Bridge or the Rush Creek Covered Bridge.

See also
 List of Registered Historic Places in Indiana
 Parke County Covered Bridges
 Parke County Covered Bridge Festival

References

Covered bridges on the National Register of Historic Places in Parke County, Indiana
Bridges completed in 1908
1908 establishments in Indiana
Wooden bridges in Indiana
Burr Truss bridges in the United States